Flow-induced dispersion analysis (FIDA) is an immobilization-free technology used for characterization and quantification of biomolecular interaction and protein concentration under native conditions. In the FIDA assay, the size of a ligand (indicator) with affinity to the target analyte is measured. When the indicator interacts with the analyte the apparent size increases and this change in size can be used to determine the analyte concentration and interaction. Additionally, the hydrodynamic radius of the analyte-indicator complex is obtained. A FIDA assay is typically completed in minutes and only requires a modest sample consumption of a few µl.

Applications 
 Quantification of analytes (e.g. proteins, peptides, DNA, nanoparticles) in complex solutions (e.g. plasma and fermentation broth )
 Determination of
 affinity constants
 binding kinetics
 molecular size (hydrodynamic radius)
oligomeric state
 diffusion coefficient

Principle 
The FIDA principle is based on measuring the change in the apparent size (diffusivity) of a selective indicator interacting with the analyte molecule. The apparent indicator size is measured by Taylor dispersion analysis in a capillary under hydrodynamic flow.

References 

Protein methods
Analytical chemistry
Protein–protein interaction assays
Biochemistry methods